Johann August Zeune (12 May 1778 –14 November 1853) was a German teacher of geography and Germanic languages, as well as the founder of the Berlin Foundation for the Blind.

Life 
Zeune was born on 12 May 1778 in Lutherstadt Wittenberg as the son of Johann Karl Zeune, professor of Greek at the University of Wittenberg. In his parents' house, he was educated by his father and tutor. In 1798 Zeune started studying at the Wittenberg University enrolled. He graduated with his thesis on the history of geography, and was awarded for a short time the dignity of an academic faculty, as a Quasi-professor of Geography. His novel „Höhenschichten-Karte” "Topological map" of the earth, had made him famous in academic circles.

In 1803, he moved to Berlin and became a teacher at the Gymnasium zum Grauen Kloster. In Berlin, where he lived as a scholar, he was on friendly terms with Johann Gottlieb Fichte and the historian Johannes von Müller. He applied unsuccessfully for an expedition into the interior of Africa, and shortly thereafter went into the "inner world of the blind". In the field of ophthalmology Zeune expanded his knowledge to the founder of the first European foundation for the Blind, Valentin Haüy in Paris. King Frederick William III decreed on 11 August 1806 to create a foundation for the blind in Berlin. Zeune was offered that job. On 13 October the same year he was able to start classes. It was the first blind school in Germany.

With money from friends and his own fortune, he saved the school by the time of distress.  Johann August Zeune was a professor of geography in 1810 in Berlin. From 1811 to 1821 he lectured at the University of Berlin also about German language and literature. Educational skills were presented in his Manual of Education of the Blind "Belisarius" (1808) and the work "Gea. Attempt at a scientific geography" (1808).

After the French occupation, he joined as a political journalist of decidedly patriotic stance.

As a Germanist, Zeune stood under the spell of romantic notions. He fought against the usage of foreign words and worked on the publication of the Nibelungenlied; of which he published a prose translation (1813) and a paperback edition (1815).

August Zeune died on 14 November 1853 in Berlin, after he had lost his eyesight in old age. He was buried at the Berlin St. George's Cemetery in the Greifswald Street 229/234.

In his honor, the Johann August Zeune School for the Blind in Berlin-Steglitz and the Zeunepromenade where named after him (see Rothenburg (Berlin)).

Literature 
 [Anonym]: Expedition into the Inner World of the Blind (Expedition in die innere Welt der Blinden). In: Süddeutsche Zeitung, 26 January 2004.
 Heinrich Kühne (Text), Heinz Motel (Zeichnungen): (Famous People and their Connection to Wittenberg) Berühmte Persönlichkeiten und ihre Verbindung zu Wittenberg. Verlag des Göttinger Tageblatt, Göttingen 1990, .
 Hartmut Mehlitz:Johann August Zeune. Berlin's Father of the Blind and his Times (Berlins Blindenvater und seine Zeit.) Bostelmann & Siebenhaar, Berlin 2003, .
 Rotary Club:Famous Wittenbergers and their Guests. Berühmte Wittenberger und ihre Gäste. Wittenberg, s.a.
 Frederick Dreves: "... unfortunately, for the most part become beggars ...". Support of the Blind between the Enlightenment and industrialization (1806 to 1860). / "... leider zum größten Theile Bettler geworden ...". Organisierte Blindenfürsorge zwischen Aufklärung und Industrialisierung (1806–1860). Freiburg im Br. 1998 (auch Hörbuchfassung: Deutsche Blinden-Bibliothek der Deutschen Blindenstudienanstalt e. V. Marburg, Nr. 9998, Sprecher: Hans-J. Domschat. Marburg 2000).
 Hans-Eugen Schulze: Review of: Friedrich Dreves: ... unfortunately, for the most part become beggars ... - Organized the Blind in Prussia between the Enlightenment and Industrialization (1806–1860). Rezension zu: Friedrich Dreves: ...leider zum größten Theile Bettler geworden... - Organisierte Blindenfürsorge in Preußen zwischen Aufklärung und Industrialisierung (1806–1860). In: Horus. Marburger Beiträge zur Integration Blinder und Sehbehinderter / Hrsg.: Deutscher Verein der Blinden und Sehbehinderten in Studium und Beruf e.V. und Deutsche Blindenstudienanstalt e.V., Marburg, Lahn. 61. Jg., 1999,  H. 2, S. 79-81.
 Alexander Mell (ed.): Encyclopedic Handbook of the Blind. Encyklopädisches Handbuch des Blindenwesens. Wien/Leipzig, 1900.

External links 
 
 Johann August Zeune School for the Blind Berlin
 Berlin in 1806
 
 Johann August Zeune Berlins Blindenvater und seine Zeit
 www.blindenschule-berlin.de

German geographers
1778 births
1853 deaths
19th-century German educators